The Monument to Christopher Columbus was a statue on a major traffic roundabout along Mexico City's Paseo de la Reforma, first dedicated in 1877. 

The statue was removed on 10 October 2020 "for restoration purposes" two days before a planned protest. Later, the Mexico City government announced that the statue would not return to its location and would be replaced with Tlalli, a sculpture intended to honor the nation's indigenous peoples. After multiple controversies related to the project, it was put on hold. Days after the cancellation, feminists installed the Glorieta de las mujeres que luchan, an antimonumenta dedicated to the nation's women. However, the city government announced on 12 October 2021, that the statue of Columbus would be officially replaced with a replica of The Young Woman of Amajac, a sculpture of an indigenous Huastec woman, which started several debates between which figure should replace Columbus.

Following months of discussion, the city government announced that both the Glorieta de las mujeres que luchan and The Young Woman of Amajac would coexist on the roundabout, while the Columbus sculpture would be relocated to the National Museum of the Viceroyalty, in Tepotzotlán, State of Mexico.

Description

On the monument's pedestal were two bas-reliefs, one depicting Christopher Columbus's arrival in the New World and the other, the construction of a church. On the corners of the pedestal were statues of friars, depicted in a seated position, said to be those who were important to the early history of Mexico including Franciscan Pedro de Gante, the first to evangelize Mexico's indigenous population, and Dominican Bartolomé de las Casas; and Antonio de Marchena and Diego de Deza, who aided Columbus in Spain.

As with "almost all the [Columbus] monuments, the gift or inspiration of Europeans or Europeans of mixed descent, include some reference to religion." In Mexico, where anticlericalism and suppression of the power of the Catholic Church had embroiled Mexico in a civil war and a foreign intervention during the nineteenth-century liberal Reform, the Columbus statue's combination of religious iconography and symbolic embodiment of European conquest and domination, has made the statue a target of protesters. One scholar suggests that Columbus "is portrayed as a conqueror, or even a conjurer, for he plucks a veil from the globe he holds."

History

The statue was part of a plan to embellish the major thoroughfare with statues of persons of historical significance to Mexico. The work was a gift to the capital of the entrepreneur, Antonio Escandón, a member of a wealthy, conservative Mexican family and who had supported Emperor Maximilian, built the Mexico City-Veracruz railway with the help of French investments and British engineers.  The railway linked the inland capital with its main east coast port. Escandón "decided to commemorate the era of the railroad in Mexico with a monument to an equally epochal event, the Discovery of the New World."

In 1873, Escandón commissioned French sculptor Charles Cordier to design and execute the statue, which was shipped to Mexico for installation. The statue was inaugurated almost immediately after liberal General Porfirio Díaz seized the presidency in 1876. The Cordier sculpture has been described as the construction of a monument "manipulated by a Mexican industrialist for greater economic ties with foreign investors." It was originally to be placed in front of the Buenavista train station in Mexico City. The statue had already been commissioned and sculpted in France, arriving in Veracruz in 1875. It was installed in 1877 under the supervision of Mexican engineer, Eleuterio Méndes.

On October 12, 1992, on the occasion of the 500 year anniversary of Columbus' voyage of discovery to America, a series of protests were held in different cities of Mexico. In Mexico City the monument was defaced after a protest lead by indigenous groups, unions and punk collectives. The protesters tried toppling the Columbus sculpture by attaching ropes to a Ruta 100 public transport bus but the attempt was frustrated by the Mexico City Police Grenadier Corps. In later demonstrations, the monument was protected in different ways to prevent the toppling of Columbus sculpture.

Removal and relocation

Before and during the George Floyd protests, anti-racist protestors began to target and remove statues of figures linked to colonialism and slavery. Christopher Columbus' controversial historical reputation led to protestors to topple numerous statues of him installed throughout the Americas. In Mexico City, a demonstration was called on October 12, 2020, to topple the Columbus sculpture. On October 10, 2020, Government of Mexico City removed the Reforma sculpture from the monument due to a previously scheduled restoration by the National Institute of Anthropology and History. The demonstration moved instead to the monument located in Buenavista. 

The government of Mexico City announced that the repositioning or the removal of the sculptures of the monument would be defined after a round of debates that were expected to be held in 2021, in the context of the commemorations of the 500th anniversary of the Fall of Tenochtitlan. On September 5, 2021, the city announced that the monument would not be returned to Reforma Avenue and it would be relocated to Parque América, in Polanco. Instead, Tlalli, a statue of a woman from the Olmec civilization by sculptor Pedro Reyes, was announced to be set at the site. By September 14, after a petition signed by "more than 350 people from the world of culture... was sent to the mayor, against Reyes' participation in the project", Reyes was deemed "inadmissible" as the artist. Mexico City Mayor Claudia Sheinbaum announced that a committee would decide on a replacement artist.

On 12 October, Sheinbaum proposed an enlarged copy of The Young Woman of Amajac to replace the statue of Columbus. The statue of Columbus was expected to be relocated during the second half of 2022.

Due to the lack of agreement as to which sculpture would replace Columbus, discussions were held during 2022. By 2023, the city government announced that the statue of Columbus would be relocated to the National Museum of the Viceroyalty, in Tepotzotlán, State of Mexico, while the Antimonumenta Vivas Nos Queremos and The Young Woman of Amajac sculptures would coexist on the roundabout.

See also

 List of monuments and memorials to Christopher Columbus

References

External links
 

1877 establishments in Mexico
1877 sculptures
Monuments and memorials in Mexico City
Monuments and memorials to Christopher Columbus
Outdoor sculptures in Mexico City
Paseo de la Reforma
Relocated buildings and structures
Statues removed in 2020
Sculptures of men in Mexico
Statues in Mexico City
Statues of Christopher Columbus
Vandalized works of art in Mexico